Yevgeny Yakovlevich Dzhugashvili (10 January 1936 – 22 December 2016) was a Soviet Air Force colonel. He was the son of Yakov Dzhugashvili, the eldest son of Soviet leader Joseph Stalin, and gained notice as a defender of his grandfather's reputation. In the 1999 elections of the Russian State Duma, he was one of the faces of the Stalin Bloc – For the USSR, a league of communist parties. He resided in Georgia, his grandfather's homeland.  He was found dead close to his home in Moscow in December 2016.

Dzhugashvili vs. Novaya Gazeta
In September 2009, Dzhugashvili made international headlines when he sued the Russian newspaper Novaya Gazeta after the magazine published an article claiming his grandfather personally signed execution orders against civilians. On 13 October 2009, the Russian court rejected Dzhugashvili's case, stating that its reasons would be made public at a later date. Dzhugasvili was given five days to appeal.

Criticism of Putin
In January 2015, responding to Russian President Vladimir Putin’s macho acts in a video, where he appears shirtless and is seen taming and riding a horse, Dzhugashvili said it is "all a publicity stunt and only showed how the president was leading the country without brains". The Independent additionally stated he had said "the mess in Russia would have been avoided if Stalin had lived for five more years".

See also
Stalinism
Neo-Stalinism
Politics of Russia

References

1936 births
2016 deaths
People from Uryupinsk
Neo-Stalinists
Communists from Georgia (country)
Russian communists
Anti-revisionists
Stalin family
New Communist Party of Georgia politicians
Soviet Air Force officers